The men's 5000 metres event at the 1994 World Junior Championships in Athletics was held in Lisbon, Portugal, at Estádio Universitário de Lisboa on 22 and 24 July.

Medalists

Results

Final
24 July

Heats
22 July

Heat 1

Heat 2

Participation
According to an unofficial count, 23 athletes from 17 countries participated in the event.

References

5000 metres
Long distance running at the World Athletics U20 Championships